Summer of Lust is the second full-length album by Regina, Saskatchewan indie pop collective Library Voices. The album was released on August 23, 2011 as the first for the band on Toronto-based independent label Nevado Records. The first single from the album, "Generation Handclap," peaked at number 23 on AMC's Canada Alternative Rock chart.

Critical reception 
Alex Young of Consequence of Sound gave the album a B and a positive review, stating that Summer of Lust "provides everything you could hope for from indie pop: heartfelt lyrics, oddly titled songs...and big instrumentation, featuring keyboards, horns, and strings" and complementing the size of the band, for this album it was seven members, saying that "the other instruments differentiate Library Voices from their contemporaries." Jedd Beaudoin of PopMatters gave the album seven out of ten stars, saying that "The outfit’s literate, dance-inducing songs are informed by ‘60s pop but aren’t wholly married to that time; there are also elements of loud ‘80s rock meant for stadiums, and some that should have been in stadiums."

Track listing

Personnel 
 Carl Johnson –  lead vocals, guitar
 Michael Dawson –  guitar, theremin, synths, organ, various others, vocals
 Brennan Ross –  guitar, vocals
 Eoin Hickey-Cameron –  bass guitar
 Paul Gutheil –  saxophone, percussion, vocals
 Amanda Scandrett –  vocals, keyboards
 Michael Thievin –  drums and percussion

References 

Library Voices albums
2011 albums